David Lavi is a retired Israeli footballer who is one of the top ten goal-scorers in Israeli history with 158 goals in the Israeli Premier League.

Honours

National
Israeli Premier League (3):
1977/78, 1979/80, 1982/83
State Cup (1):
1977/78
League Cup (2):
1982/83, 1983/84

International
UEFA Intertoto Cup (3):
1978, 1980, 1983

Individual
Israeli Premier League - Top Goalscorer (4):
1977/78, 1979/80, 1983/84, 1984/85

External links
 
 
 David Lavi at Walla

1956 births
Living people
Israeli Jews
Israeli footballers
Maccabi Netanya F.C. players
Beitar Tel Aviv F.C. players
Maccabi HaShikma Ramat Hen F.C. players
Maccabi Netanya F.C. managers
Footballers from Netanya
Israeli people of Libyan-Jewish descent
Association football forwards
Israeli football managers
Israel international footballers